Brum Beat was a monthly magazine about the music of Birmingham, England, and the neighbouring towns. The magazine was started in 1970 as Midlands Beat by promoter and band-manager Jim Simpson, who sold it to its latter editor, Steve Morris, who in turn relaunched it in newspaper format as The Beat, before converting it into a website.

It took its original name from the term coined in the late 1950s to collectively describe the City's music scene, in the manner of the Mersey sound.

It has been suggested that The Moody Blues, formed in May 1964, were the first of the "Brum Beat" bands to become internationally famous. other bands such as the Spencer Davis Group were members of the Brum Beat scene.

References

External links
Brum Beat website

1970 establishments in the United Kingdom
Defunct magazines published in the United Kingdom
Magazines established in 1970
Magazines with year of disestablishment missing
Mass media in Birmingham, West Midlands
Monthly magazines published in the United Kingdom
Music magazines published in the United Kingdom
Music in Birmingham, West Midlands